Stephen Clark Worster (July 8, 1949 – August 13, 2022) was an American professional football player who was a fullback for the Hamilton Tiger-Cats in the Canadian Football League (CFL). Following his prep career in Texas, he played college football for the Texas Longhorns under coach Darrell Royal. A two-time All-American, Worster was the inspiration for the team's wishbone formation, and won two national championships with the Longhorns.

High school career
Worster was born in Rawlins, Wyoming, on July 8, 1949, but his parents settled in Orange County, Texas when he was a young boy. Worster attended Bridge City High School in Bridge City, Texas, where he played as a catcher on the baseball team and a fullback on the football team. He was All-District for four years, All-State for three years, and accumulated 5,422 yards during his high school career, including 38 100-yard games, which is second in Texas prep history behind Robert Strait's 41 (Ken Hall and Billy Sims also had 38 100-yard games). Worster led the Bridge City Cardinals to a 13–1 season and the Class 3-A state football championship in 1966, running for 2,210 yards and being named a High-School All-American.

After his graduation, Bridge City High School retired his jersey number. He was later inducted into the Texas High School Hall of Fame.

College career
Worster was heavily recruited to play college football for several schools. He chose to accept a scholarship to the University of Texas at Austin to play for the Longhorns, where he played under coach Darrell Royal. He was the motivation behind Royal's famed wishbone offense, which was introduced in 1968. Fans nicknamed Worster "Big Woo".

During his years at Texas, Worster rushed for 2,353 yards and scored 36 touchdowns. His teams won three Southwest Conference titles and two national championships.  Worster was featured on the cover of Dave Campbell's Texas Football magazine in 1970. He finished fourth in balloting for the Heisman Trophy, behind Jim Plunkett, Joe Theismann, and Archie Manning. Worster was a two-time All-American (1969 and 1970) and three-time All-Southwest Conference selection, and was voted 1970 Texas Amateur Athlete of the Year by Texas Sports Writers Association. Worster has also been inducted into the Texas Longhorn Hall of Fame and the Cotton Bowl Hall of Fame.

Professional career
The Los Angeles Rams of the National Football League (NFL) selected Worster as the 12th pick in the fourth round of the 1971 NFL draft. He could not come to terms on a contract with the Rams, and did not play in the NFL, spending one year (1971) in the CFL, playing in three games for the Hamilton Tiger-Cats. Worster decided that football was no longer fun, leading him to retire.

Later life
Worster completed his bachelor's degree and then worked in sales for 28 years after retiring from football, and then managed rental properties. He moved to San Antonio, then Austin, and then back to Bridge City after retiring from football. Worster was a sales manager for the Lone Star Brewing Company in San Antonio. He met his wife, Ann, in San Antonio. They had two children prior to their divorce.

Worster died on August 13, 2022.

References

External links 
 

1949 births
2022 deaths
All-American college football players
American football fullbacks
American players of Canadian football
Hamilton Tiger-Cats players
People from Orange County, Texas
People from Rawlins, Wyoming
Players of American football from Texas
Players of American football from Wyoming
Texas Longhorns football players